Chesapeake Beach may refer to a community in the United States:

 Chesapeake Beach, Maryland
 Chesapeake Beach, Virginia